Whose Was the Hand? is a 1912 Australian silent film directed by Alfred Rolfe. It is considered a lost film.

Plot
A young man is heavily in debt and decides to get out of it by robbing his uncle. He does this with a criminal accomplice. During the course of the robbery, the uncle enters and fights with the nephew. The nephew kills his uncle and wipes his blood stained hands on the panel of the door.

The uncle's secretary is first on the scene and is arrested. However fingerprints of the blood stained hands do not match. Detective Sharp investigates further, leading him to the nephew, whose finger prints do match. The film ends with the rescue of the murdered man's daughter from a burning building, and the arrest of the murderer's accomplices.

An important scene involves a burning building where a lady is rescued.

The chapter headings were:
the ne'er-d-well
the forgery
the attempted robbery
the murder mystery
the hand on the wall
wrongly accused
a clue, a confession
the fight on the roof
alarm of fire
dashed to death.

Production
The film was shot in Sydney.

Reception
One critic said "the production was one of exceptional excellence. For clever acting, extensive staging, daring effects and quality of photography, the film stands as a masterpiece."

References

External links
 
Whose Was the Hand? at AustLit

Australian black-and-white films
Lost Australian films
Australian silent feature films
Lost crime drama films
1910s crime drama films
1912 lost films
1912 films
Films directed by Alfred Rolfe
Australian crime drama films
1912 drama films
Silent crime drama films
1910s English-language films